The following lists events that happened in 2013 in the Republic of the Union of Myanmar.

Incumbents
 President: Thein Sein 
 First Vice President: Sai Mauk Kham 
 Second Vice President: Nyan Tun

Events

March
 March 20 - Tensions between Buddhist and Muslim flare into violent clashes in various cities throughout central and eastern part of the country.

October
 October 11 - A string of unexplained bombings kills three people and injured 10 more from 11 to 17 October in different parts of the country.

December
December 11 - The 27th Southeast Asian Games opening ceremony is held at the Wunna Theikdi Stadium, Naypyidaw.

References

 
Burma
Years of the 21st century in Myanmar
Burma
2010s in Myanmar